Dvorák is a crater on Mercury. It has a diameter of 75 kilometers. Its name was adopted by the International Astronomical Union (IAU) in 1976. Dvorak is named for the Czech composer Antonín Dvořák, who lived from 1841 to 1904.

Dvorák lies on the northwest rim of Sanai crater.

References

Impact craters on Mercury
Crater